The Hubschraubermuseum Bückeburg (Bückeburg Helicopter Museum) is located in the German town of Bückeburg, 30 miles (50 km) to the west of Hanover. The museum is the sole museum in Germany specialising in rotary-wing flight and one of few worldwide. The museum is dedicated to the history and technology of the helicopter.

History
Sergeant Major Werner Noltemeyer gathered parts, models, books and photographs of rotary-wing aircraft while he was training to become a helicopter pilot in the German Army Aviation Corps.  In 1959 the German School of Army Aviation was established in Bückeburg. In the late 1960s, the city council of Bückeburg offered Noltemeyer an old timbered-framed building for use as a museum which opened in 1971. Due to a shortage of space an additional exhibition hall was added in 1980. The museum was further expanded with a glass addition in 2011.

Hubschrauberzentrum e. V.
The Hubschrauberzentrum e. V. (Helicopter Centre Association) - founded in 1970 - is an organisation of volunteers that operates and maintains the museum. The association maintains an extensive archive and a library for scientific study of the history of rotorcraft.

Exhibits 
Displayed in the museum are 52 single and multi-rotor helicopters, gyrocopters, gyrodynes as well as numerous helicopter models, historical photos, working models of rotors, technical demonstration and teaching material, parts, tools or equipment for helicopters (status September 2022). A helicopter simulator is available for museum visitors.

Single-rotor helicopters
Exhibits include the following helicopter types:
Aérospatiale Alouette III (SA 316B) 
Aérospatiale SA 330J Puma
Bell 47 G2 Sioux 
  Bell UH-1D „Iroquois“, last Helicopter from this type of the German Army Aviation Corps with special paint „Goodbye Huey“
Bölkow Bo 46
Bölkow Bo 102 
Bölkow Bo 103 
Bölkow Bo 103 V3 (Prototype) 
Bölkow P166/3 Flying Jeep 
Bristol 171 Sycamore Mk. 52
 Eurocopter Dauphin SA 365 C3
Eurocopter EC-665 Tiger (prototype No 3)
Georges G-1 Papillon (home-made experimental helicopter)
Georges G-2 (home-made experimental helicopter)
Havertz HZ-5 (home-made helicopter)
Heimbächer No 4
Hiller H-23C Raven
Hughes TH-55 Osage
MBB Bo 105 P-1A1 anti-tank helicopter
MBB Bo 105 CB-4 „The Flying Bulls“
MBB/Eurocopter Bo 108
MBB/Kawasaki BK 117
Merckle SM 67
Mil Mi-1
Mil Mi-2
Nagler-Rolz NR 54 (replica)
Saunders-Roe Skeeter 
Siemetzki ASRO
Sikorsky S-58 / H-34) 
Sud Aviation Alouette II (SE 3130)
Sud-Ouest SO 1221 Djinn

Multi-rotor helicopters
Aerotechnik WGM 21
Cornu No II (first successful helicopter flight on 13 November 1907 - replica)
Focke-Wulf Fw 61 (replica)
Goslich Pedalcopter
Hiller VZ-1 Pawnee ("Flying Platform" - replica)
Ingenuity (replica of the small helicopter being test flown on Mars, April 2021 - present)
Kaman HH-43 Huskie
Kamov Ka-26
Vertol V-43 / H-21 C
Wagner Rotocar (combination between car and helicopter)

Gyrocopters
Air & Space 18A Flymobil
Bensen Gyrocopter B-8-M
Derschmidt Gyrocopter
Focke-Achgelis Fa 330 Wagtail 
Krauss Autogiro TRS 1
Rotortec Cloud Dancer I 
Rotortec Cloud Dancer II 
Saalbach home-made Gyrocopter

Gyrodynes
VFW-Fokker H2
VFW-Fokker H3 Sprinter

Helicopter simulator
 for virtual flights by visitors

See also
American Helicopter Museum, Pennsylvania, USA
Classic Rotors Museum, California, USA
The Helicopter Museum, Somerset, England
Related lists
List of aerospace museums

References

Aerospace museums in Germany
Helicopter museums
Museums in Lower Saxony
Museums established in 1971
1971 establishments in West Germany